An Address to the Nation is a speech made from the White House by the President of the United States. It is traditionally made from the Oval Office. It is considered among the most solemn settings for an address made by the President, and is most often delivered to announce a major new policy initiative, on the occasion of a President's departure from office, or during times of national emergency (natural disaster, war, etc.).

Background

Presidents use Oval Office addresses as a way to directly communicate with the American people. It is considered to be a major address and it functions as a way to move public opinion by having a direct connection with the President of the United States. Presidential historian, Robert Dallek stated, “The Oval Office invokes the center of the presidential authority. That's the president's office, that's where he supposedly makes decisions, where he governs.” The tone of the speech is set when Presidents decide to make a speech in the Oval Office. It lets the American people know who is really in charge when it comes time to make executive decisions regarding the United States of America. The Oval Office is where the President spends a large amount of time and it is where he makes a lot of tough decisions regarding the country. It is also where the President will communicate national news such as terrorist attacks and each President usually gives their Farewell Speech in the Oval Office.

The first Oval Office address was delivered to the nation by President Herbert Hoover, who spoke on peace efforts and arms reduction throughout the world. President Dwight D. Eisenhower used the format in 1957 to inform the United States of his decision to send troops to Little Rock to enforce school desegregation. Being only the second ever televised address directly from the president's office, Eisenhower had to explain as much to the audience, saying, "in speaking from the house of Lincoln, of Jackson, of Wilson, my words would better convey both the sadness I feel today in the actions I feel compelled to make, and the firmness with which I intend to pursue this course."

Some previous addresses include John F. Kennedy's 1962 news of the Cuban Missile Crisis, Jimmy Carter's 1979 "Malaise" speech, Ronald Reagan's speech following the Space Shuttle Challenger disaster in 1986, George W. Bush's Address to the Nation on the evening of the 2001 September 11 terrorist attacks and Barack Obama's June 2010 speech addressing the issue of the Deepwater Horizon oil spill.

Traditionally, the addresses are delivered with the President sitting at the Resolute desk speaking into the camera. Occasionally, however, the President will stand at a lectern on the opposite side of the Oval Office and give the address. Previously, it was also common for an artificial background to be placed behind the President, ordinarily consisting of plain blue fabric. Since the administration of Jimmy Carter, the preference has instead been for the natural backdrop of the Office's windows.

There have been suggestions that the traditional Oval Office address is falling out of favor in the Information Age, with White House aide Daniel Pfeiffer describing it as "an argument from the 80s" when President Ronald Reagan would draw tens of millions of viewers per address (42 in all, the second-most of any president; Nixon ranks first, having given 43). Television networks are increasingly reluctant to sacrifice airtime for a political purpose. President Obama preferred to use the East Room, as in his announcement of the death of Osama bin Laden; Trump prefers to use the Diplomatic reception room.

The tradition of the prime-time Oval Office address has continued into the Trump and Biden presidencies, with the address of January 8, 2019 during the government shutdown being the first time that Trump requested airtime.

List of Oval Office addresses
This list includes other addresses that are not primetime oval office addresses

See also

State of the Union address
Weekly Address of the President of the United States
Fireside Chats
Cadena nacional

Notes

References

Bibliography

United States presidential speeches